The 1993 Winnipeg Blue Bombers finished in 1st place in the East Division with a 14–4 record. They appeared in the Grey Cup for the second straight year but lost to the Edmonton Eskimos.

Offseason

CFL Draft

Preseason

Regular season

Season standings

Season schedule

Playoffs

East Final

Grey Cup

Awards and records
CFL's Most Outstanding Offensive Lineman Award – Chris Walby (OT)

1993 CFL All-Stars
RB – Mike Richardson, CFL All-Star
WR – David Williams, CFL All-Star
OG – David Black, CFL All-Star
OT – Chris Walby, CFL All-Star
P – Bob Cameron, CFL All-Star
LB – Elfrid Payton, CFL All-Star
DB – Darryl Sampson, CFL All-Star

References

Winnipeg Blue Bombers seasons
HamWinnipeg Blue Bombers Season, 1993
James S. Dixon Trophy championship seasons
1993 in Manitoba